Wallie Abraham Hurwitz (February 18, 1886 in Joplin, Missouri – January 6, 1958 in Ithaca, New York) was an American mathematician who worked on analysis.

Hurwitz graduated from the University of Missouri with a bachelor's degree and then went to Harvard to do graduate work. He won a Sheldon Traveling Fellowship, which enabled him to study at the University of Göttingen, where he earned a doctoral degree under Hilbert in 1910. In 1912 Hurwitz joined the mathematics faculty of Cornell University, where he remained until he died in 1958 at age seventy-one. His doctoral students include R. H. Cameron and Florence M. Mears.

Hurwitz's private library contained nearly three thousand books. This private library had many books on cryptography, several of which were borrowed by the U. S. Navy early in WWII because there were no copies of them in the Library of Congress. Hurwitz had an extensive knowledge of music and a large collection of Gilbert and Sullivan scores, reviews, programs, and related memorabilia. He invested brilliantly in the stock market, selling out shortly before the 1929 crash and buying in close to the bottom. Hurwitz left his considerable financial estate to the U. of Missouri, Harvard, and Cornell.

Publications
 with R. G. D. Richardson: 
 
 
 
 
 with Louis Lazarus Silverman: 
 
 
 
 
 
 with David Clinton Gillespie:

References

Wallie Abraham Hurwitz memorial notice

External links
 
 

20th-century American mathematicians
Cornell University faculty
University of Göttingen alumni
University of Missouri alumni
University of Missouri mathematicians
Mathematicians from Missouri
1886 births
1958 deaths
Harvard University alumni